Per Edgar Ragnar Wicksell (26 September 1892 – 31 July 1974) was a Swedish football and bandy player. He competed in the 1912 Summer Olympics and in the 1920 Summer Olympics. In 1912 he played as midfielder one match in the main tournament as well as one match in the consolation tournament.

Wicksell made 32 appearances for Sweden and scored 3 goals.

Honours

Football
Djurgårdens IF
 Svenska Mästerskapet: 1912, 1915, 1917, 1920

Bandy
Djurgårdens IF
 Svenska Mästerskapet: 1912

References

External links
 Swedish squad in 1912

1892 births
1974 deaths
Association football central defenders
Association football midfielders
Swedish footballers
Swedish bandy players
Sweden international footballers
Djurgårdens IF Fotboll players
Olympic footballers of Sweden
Footballers at the 1912 Summer Olympics
Footballers at the 1920 Summer Olympics
Djurgårdens IF Bandy players